U-23 may refer to one of the following German submarines:

 , was the lead ship of the Type U 23 class of submarines; launched in 1913 and served in the First World War until sunk on 20 July 1915
 During the First World War, Germany also had these submarines with similar names:
 , a Type UB II submarine launched in 1915 and interned in Spain 29 July 1917
 , a Type UC II submarine launched in 1916 and surrendered on 25 November 1918
 , a Type IIB submarine that served in the Second World War until scuttled on 10 September 1944

U-23 or U-XXIII may also refer to:
 , a  submarine of the Austro-Hungarian Navy

Submarines of Germany